Vasu is a 2002 Indian Telugu-language musical romantic comedy film written and directed by A. Karunakaran, and produced by K. S. Rama Rao under the Creative Commercials banner. It stars Venkatesh and Bhumika Chawla with music composed by Harris Jayaraj.

Vasu marked Venkatesh's 50th film as an actor. The film won two Nandi Awards. Later, the film was dubbed into Tamil as Vetri and Hindi as Cheetah The Leopard.

Plot
After graduation, Vasu Venkatesh Daggubati runs a college canteen, and music school and teaches music for seven years to make his living. His father is an IPS officer and he wants Vasu to appear for Civil Services examinations to take up an IPS career. But Vasu has different plans for his future. He dreams of becoming a musician and a singer.

One fine day, a young IPS officer Brahmaji comes to Vasu's place to seek the blessings of Vasu's father. He admits that Vasu's father is the source of inspiration for him to become an IPS officer. Vasu's father feels dejected and bad that his son does not heed his advice to give civil service exams. Meanwhile, Vasu spots a beautiful girl Divya Bhoomika Chawla on the street. He plays every possible trick to woo her, but all his plans backfire and make him appear foolish in Divya's eyes.

Vasu's father spots Vasu bashing up guys in the streets and asks him to leave the house and stay outside. Vasu leaves the house. Divya goes to Vasu's place along with her luggage when Vasu was about to leave the house. Later, Vasu learns that Divya is the daughter of Vasu's father's childhood friend. Vasu sees this as an opportunity to get close to Divya. He returns to his home and promises that he will not touch music again and concentrate only on his studies. But Vasu secretly pursues his musical ambitions.

Vasu passes the preliminary auditions of the Music Talent search conducted by Sony Music Company. When Vasu's father spots the letter from Sony, he argues with his son and asks him to either be there in the house and study for IPS or leave home to pursue his dream of becoming a musician. Meanwhile, Divya falls in love with Vasu and vice versa, but they never express their feelings towards each other. Vasu's sister loves Divya's brother, and it is okayed by the parents of both parties. It is also revealed that Divya already okayed a guy called Manohar by looking at his photograph (this is much before she met Vasu).

Vasu is on the stage to prove himself as a singer and musician in the final auditions of Sony Talent Search. Divya and Manohar are to marry on the same day, and Vasu's sister is to marry Divya's brother. Vasu wins the prize at the audition and sits in a park mourning his heartbreak. Then, his father and sister arrive and his father apologizes for his opinion of Vasu's career. It is revealed then that Divya did not marry that day along with Vasu's sister as she loved Vasu. In the end, the lovers unite, and the two couples' marriages are rescheduled.

Cast

Venkatesh as Vasu
Bhumika Chawla as Divya
Vijayakumar as Commissioner Rao
Manjula Vijayakumar as Kamala (Vasu's mother)
Sunil as Balu  
Ali as Bill Gates 
Dharmavarapu Subramanyam as Sony Music Company Manager
M. S. Narayana as Mula Shankar Rao 		
Ranganath as Srinivasa Rao 
Brahmaji as ACP Subramanyam
Achyuth as Vignesh
Varsha as Radhika
Duvvasi Mohan as Doctor
Subbaraya Sharma as Lecturer 
G. V. Sudhakar Naidu as Goon	
Chitti Babu as Beggar
Raghunatha Reddy
Tanish as arun's friend
Jogi Naidu as Vasu's friend
Junior Relangi as Doctor
Anilraj as Arun
A. Karunakaran in a cameo appearance

Soundtrack
 

Music composed by Harris Jayaraj. The music was released on ADITYA Music Company. (The audio got unanimous hit talk all over airplay and within 4 days of its release it had sold over 2 lakhs. The peppy number "Sportive Boys" topped the charts for many weeks.) The song "Paataku Pranam" uses beats from Micheal Jackson's "Billie Jean".

Awards
Nandi Awards
Best Home Viewing Feature Film - K. S. Rama Rao
Best Male Playback Singer - S. P. Balasubrahmanyam for "Padana Teeyaga" song.

References

External links

2002 films
2000s Telugu-language films
Films directed by A. Karunakaran
Films scored by Harris Jayaraj